The 2005 Chivas USA season was the club's first season of existence, and their first in Major League Soccer, the top flight of American soccer. The club competed in the MLS's Western Conference, where they finished in sixth place, or last place, in the Conference.

Season review
Thomas Rongen was appointed as Chivas USA's head coach in September 2004, and coached the team until May 2005, when he was replaced with Javier Ledesma on an interim basis. At the end of June, Hans Westerhof was appointed as the permanent manager until the end of the season.

Transfers

In

Out

Roster

Competitions

Major League Soccer

League table

Results summary

Results

U.S. Open Cup

Statistics

Appearances and goals

|-
|colspan="14"|Players away from Chivas USA on loan:
|-
|colspan="14"|Players who left Chivas USA during the season:

|}

Goal scorers

Disciplinary Record

References

Chivas USA seasons
Chivas USA
Chivas USA
Chivas USA